{{DISPLAYTITLE:D-Fructose-L-histidine}}

-Fructose--histidine (FruHis) is a ketosamine combining the -isomer of fructose and the -isomer of histidine into a functional group. FruHis is present in dried fruits. In interaction with lycopene, FruHis is a potential food related antioxidant and chemopreventive agent, found abundantly in dried tomatoes.

Research
A group of carbohydrate derivatives present in dehydrated tomato products interact with lycopene against prostate cancer. FruHis strongly synergizes with lycopene against the proliferation of highly metastatic rat prostate cancer cell lines in vitro. The FruHis/lycopene combination significantly inhibits in vivo tumorigenesis in syngeneic rats. The ketosamine completely blocks DNA oxidative degradation at >250 μmol/L in vitro, whereas neither ascorbate nor phenolic antioxidants from tomato are effective protectors.

Based on these studies, the American Association for Cancer Research has concluded that FruHis may exert tumor-preventive effect through its antioxidant activity and interaction with lycopene.

References

Ketohexoses
Amino sugars
Hexosamines